Offoué-Onoye is a department of Ogooué-Lolo Province in Gabon. It had a population of 2,743 in 2013.

References 

Departments of Gabon